Shadows on the Hudson (original title Shotns baym Hodson ) is a novel by Isaac Bashevis Singer.  First serialized in The Forward, a Yiddish newspaper, it was published in book form in 1957.  It was translated into English by Joseph Sherman in 1998.  The book follows a group of prosperous Jewish refugees in New York City following World War II, just prior to the founding of the state of Israel.

1958 American novels
Yiddish-language literature
Novels by Isaac Bashevis Singer
Novels first published in serial form
Works originally published in The Forward
Novels set in New York City